A fleet or naval fleet is a large formation of warships – the largest formation in any navy – controlled by one leader. A fleet at sea is the direct equivalent of an army on land.

Purpose
In the modern sense, fleets are usually, but not necessarily, permanent formations and are generally assigned to a particular ocean or sea. Most fleets are named after that ocean or sea, but the convention in the United States Navy is to use numbers.

A fleet is typically commanded by an admiral, who is often also a commander in chief. Still, many fleets have been or are commanded by vice admirals or even rear admirals. Most fleets are divided into several squadrons, each under a subordinate admiral. Those squadrons, in turn, are often divided into divisions. In the Age of Sail, fleets were divided into van, center, and rear squadrons, named after each squadron's place in the line of battle. In more modern times, the squadrons are typically composed of homogeneous groups of the same class of warship, such as battleships or cruisers.

Since many smaller navies contain a single fleet, the term the fleet is often synonymous with the navy.

Multinational fleets are not uncommon in naval history. For example, several nations made up the Holy League fleet at the Battle of Lepanto in 1571, and a Franco-Spanish fleet faced the British Royal Navy at the Battle of Trafalgar in 1805. In modern times, NATO has formed standing combined fleets and operations from several national navies such as Operation Active Endeavour.

Modern fleets

Modern fleets combine surface warships, submarines, support ships, and ship-based aircraft to conduct naval operations at sea. Generally understood to be the blue water, or oceanic, green water or littoral versus the brown water or coastal/riverine forces. The fleets of larger navies are usually divided into smaller numbered or named fleets based on geographic operating areas or administrative groupings of the same type of ships.

Modern fleets are usually administrative units. Individual task forces are formed to conduct specific operations.

See also
 List of fleets

References

 
Naval ships
Fleet